George Thomas "Tom" Tait (born January 12, 1937) is an American professor, author, and volleyball coach. Tait founded both the Penn State Nittany Lions women's volleyball and Penn State Nittany Lions men's volleyball teams beginning in 1974. Since then, the teams have won a combined 9 NCAA national championships (women's: 7; men's: 2). Because of his success in developing the Penn State programs, he has been known as the "founding father" of Penn State volleyball.

Penn State
Tait received his Ph.D. from Penn State in 1969 and became a faculty member. Prior to going into volleyball, he served as assistant track and field coach. He was approached by both the men's and women's volleyball clubs to help build the programs in 1974.

Women's team
Tait began building the Penn State women's volleyball program in the early 1970s, elevating them from club to varsity status. The first official team began playing in 1976. Tait, who was also coaching the men's team, decided to focus on the men's team and passed the helm to Russ Rose, who would go on to becoming one of the most successful coaches in NCAA history.

Men's team
Tait officially elevated the men's team from club status to an NCAA Division I Program in 1977. During his time coaching the team, he won 8 conference titles and reached the NCAA Final Four 6 times.

Awards
1986 Volleyball Monthly National Coach of the Year
5 times Eastern Collegiate Coach of the Year
EIVA Coach Emeritus
EIVA Hall of Fame (2012)
Member of the inaugural AVCA Hall of Fame induction class (2003)
USA Volleyball All Time Great Coach.

Head coaching record

Other works
He also coached the men's United States national volleyball teams in 1984 and 1988. 

In addition to his coaching, was a professor at Penn State in kinesiology. Tait retired from teaching at Penn State in 1996, and was a Distinguished Service Professor of Exercise Science and Coaching at Brevard College from 1996 through 2006.

References

1937 births
Living people
American volleyball coaches
Penn State Nittany Lions women's volleyball coaches
Penn State Nittany Lions men's volleyball coaches
Pennsylvania State University alumni
University of Maryland, College Park alumni
Penn State Nittany Lions track and field coaches